Adenocalymma is a genus of plants in the family Bignoniaceae. This New World genus of lianas contains approximately 93 accepted Species.

Its native range stretches from Mexico down to Tropical America. It is found in the countries of Argentina, Belize, Bolivia, Brazil, Colombia, Costa Rica, Ecuador, El Salvador, French Guiana, Guatemala, Guyana, Honduras, Mexico, Nicaragua, Panamá, Paraguay, Peru, Suriname, Trinidad-Tobago, Uruguay, Venezuela and the Windward Islands.

Adenocalymma species are used as food plants by the larva of the hepialid moth Trichophassus giganteus. The plants are pollinated by a variety of animals including insects, birds and bats.

Selected species
Adenocalymma alliaceum
Adenocalymma apparicianum
Adenocalymma apurense
Adenocalymma arthropetiolatum
Adenocalymma bracteatum
Adenocalymma calycina
Adenocalymma comosum 
Adenocalymma coriaceum
Adenocalymma cosmosa
Adenocalymma densiflora
Adenocalymma dichilum
Adenocalymma divaricatum
Adenocalymma hatschbachii
Adenocalymma impressum
Adenocalymma inundatum
Adenocalymma itayana
Adenocalymma magdalenense
Adenocalymma marginatum
Adenocalymma mexiae
Adenocalymma obovatum
Adenocalymma obtusifolia
Adenocalymma ocositense
Adenocalymma paulistarum
Adenocalymma prancei
Adenocalymma purpurascens
Adenocalymma saulense
Adenocalymma scansile
Adenocalymma sousae
Adenocalymma subincanum
Adenocalymma ternatum
Adenocalymma uleanum

References

External links

HOSTS

Bignoniaceae
Bignoniaceae genera
Flora of Mexico
Flora of Central America
Flora of the Windward Islands
Flora of northern South America
Flora of western South America
Flora of Brazil
Flora of Northeast Argentina